HEICO Corporation is an aerospace and electronics company that focuses on niche markets.

HEICO’s products are found in aircraft, spacecraft, defense equipment, medical equipment, and telecommunications systems.

HEICO's Flight Support Group is the largest independent provider of FAA-approved aircraft replacement parts; a provider of aircraft accessories component repair and overhaul services for avionic, electro-mechanical, flight surface, hydraulic and pneumatic applications; commercial aviation and military aviation parts distribution; and a manufacturer of other aircraft parts.

HEICO’s Electronic Technologies Group designs and manufactures niche electronic, electro-optical, microwave and other components found in aviation, broadcast, defense, homeland security, medical, space, telecom and other equipment.

HEICO’s customers include airlines, overhaul shops, satellite manufacturers, commercial and defense equipment producers, medical equipment manufacturers, government agencies and telecommunications equipment suppliers.

Products
HEICO's products can be found on large commercial aircraft regional, business and military aircraft, industrial turbines, medical equipment, rockets, satellites, targeting systems, missiles and electro-optical devices.

Products include:
 FAA-approved Parts Manufacturer Approval parts and DER-approved repairs
 Aircraft and engine component maintenance, repair and overhaul
 Electrical and electro-optical components

History 
When it began in 1957, HEICO focused on manufacturing laboratory equipment and after an acquisition in 1974, HEICO focused on replacement parts for commercial aviation as well as providing maintenance and repair services.  Since 1990, HEICO acquired more than eighty specialized businesses.

Acquisitions include: Engineering Design Team, Inc. (2005), Switchcraft (2011), Quell Corporation (December 2019), BERNIER (July 2019), Research Electronics International, LLC (June 2019), Decavo, LLC (February 2019), Solid Sealing Technology, Inc., Apex Microtechnology, Inc., Specialty Silicone Products, Inc., Optical Display Engineering, Emergency Locator Transmitter Beacon product line of Instrumar Limited, and Sensor Technology Engineering, Inc.

In August 2020, HEICO announced that its Electronic Technologies Group acquired Intelligent Devices, LLC, and Transformational Security, LLC.

Connect Tech Inc. announced its acquisition by HEICO Corporation on 18 August 2020.

References

Companies listed on the New York Stock Exchange
Aerospace companies of the United States
Companies based in Broward County, Florida
Manufacturing companies based in Florida
Defense companies of the United States
Hollywood, Florida